Workforce Singapore (WSG) is a statutory board under the Ministry of Manpower of the Government of Singapore.

During the worldwide COVID-19 pandemic in 2020, when many Singapore citizens and Permanent Residents lost their jobs due to the closure of businesses, Workforce Singapore played a vital part in career-coaching the people of Singapore into transitioning into essential industries. For example, it helped by organising resume-crafting services both over the phone and in person with unemployed job-seekers, and it had a website that consolidated career resources, training programmes, as well as job openings.

References

	

2016 establishments in Singapore
Government agencies established in 2016
Statutory boards of the Singapore Government